Ochapowace 71-7 is an Indian reserve of the Ochapowace Nation in Saskatchewan. It is 11 kilometres northeast of Dubuc. In the 2016 Canadian Census, it recorded a population of 0 living in 0 of its 0 total private dwellings.

References

Indian reserves in Saskatchewan
Division No. 5, Saskatchewan
Ochapowace Nation